Amata divalis  is a species of moth of the family Erebidae described by William Schaus and W. G. Clements in 1893. It is found in Equatorial Guinea and Sierra Leone.

References 

divalis
Moths of Africa
Moths described in 1893